Abū ‘Amr  Isḥaq ibn Mirār al-Shaybānī (d. 206/821, or 210/825, or 213/828, or 216/831) was a famous lexicographer-encyclopedist and collector-transmitter of Arabic poetry of the Kufan School of philology.

A native of Ramādat al-Kūfah, who lived in Baghdad, he was a mawla (client) under the protection of the Banū Shaybān, hence his nisba. Descended from an Iranian landowner (dihqān) on his paternal side, his mother was a 'Nabataean' (an Aramaic-speaking, rural Iraqi), and he reportedly knew a little of the 'Nabataean' language (an unattested form of Aramaic).  The biographers al-Nadīm and Ibn Khallikān quote a claim  by Ibn al-Sikkit's that he lived to the age of one hundred and eighteen and wrote in his own hand up to his death, in 213/828.  However this is disputed by a claim that he died in 206/821 aged one hundred and ten, and this latter is deemed credible.

Abū 'Amr's teachers were Rukayn b. Rabī' al-Shāmī, a transmitter of ḥadīth and al-Mufaddal al-Dabbi, who developed his love of poetry.  His son ‘Amr relates that he collected and classed poems, diwans (collections), from the jahiliyya (pre-Islamic) period from more than eighty Arab tribes.  He wrote more than eighty volumes in his own hand and deposited these  in the mosque of Kūfah.

The eminent scholars Ibn Hanbal, al-Kasim ibn Sallām, and Ibn al-Sikkit, the author of the Islāh al-Mantik, learned from him.

Of his lexicographical works, often of a very specialized nature, only the Kitāb al-Jīm (Kitab al-Lughat or Kitab al-Huruf), survives.

Works by Abū ‘Amr  al-Shaybānī

The Strange in the Ḥadīth
On Dialects, or Rare forms Known by the Jīm (the J); Kitāb al-Jīm, or Kitāb al-Hurūf, or Kitab al-Lughat
The Great Collection of Anecdotes, or Rare Forms, in three manuscript editions, large, small, and medium;
Treatise on Bees
The Palm
Treatise on The Camel
The Disposition of Man
Letters
Commentary on the book “Eloquent Style”
Treatise on the Horse

Poets edited by Abū ‘Amr  al-Shaybānī
Al-Ḥuṭay’ah
Labīd ibn Rabī’ah
Tamīm ibn Ubayy ibn Muqbil
Durayd ibn al-Ṣimmah
‘Amrj ibn Ma’dī Karib
Al-A’shā al-Kabīr (Maymūn ibn Qays)
Mutamminm ibn Nuwayrah
Al-Zibraqān ibn Badr
Ḥumayd ibn Thawr al-Rājiz
Ḥumayd al-Arqaṭ
Abū al-Aswad al-Du’alī
Abū al-Najm al-‘Ijlī
Al-‘Ajjāj al-Rājaz

Notes

References

Sources

 

730s births
828 deaths
8th-century Arabs
8th-century non-fiction writers
8th-century people from the Abbasid Caliphate
9th-century people from the Abbasid Caliphate
9th-century non-fiction writers
9th-century Arabs
Arab lexicographers
Banu Shayban
Encyclopedists of the medieval Islamic world
People from Kufa
People of Aramean descent